The 2012 Sydney Roosters season was the 105th in the club's history. Coached by Brian Smith and captained by Braith Anasta, they competed in the National Rugby League's 2012 Telstra Premiership. The Roosters finished the regular season 13th (out of 16), failing to reach the finals for the second consecutive year.

Pre-season

Results
The Sydney Roosters will play 2 Trial games in 2012. The first game will be against the Canterbury-Bankstown Bulldogs and the second against the Wests Tigers. In the Roosters' first trial game of the year they went up against the Bulldogs at Belmore Sports Ground which was attended by around 12,000 fans, the game ended with the Roosters winning 28–16. In the second trial match they went up against the Wests Tigers at Campbelltown Stadium which was attended by 7,426 fans, The game ended with the roosters rallying from behind to win 28–24.

Regular season

Results
These are the results and fixtures of the Sydney Roosters 2012 Season. They started their 2012 season well against their longtime rivals the South Sydney Rabbitohs, with a comeback with the clock showing two and a half minutes.

Ladder

Squad

2012 NRL Sydney Roosters Team

Player Summary

References

External links
 www.nrl.com
 Sydney Roosters website

Sydney Roosters seasons
Sydney Roosters season